Jale Dreloa (born 21 April 1995) is a Fijian footballer who plays as a defender for Labasa in the National Football League and the Fiji national football team.

Club career
Until September 2017 Dreloa had never played for any other district than Suva. However, in September 2017 he moved to Labasa.

National team
Dreloa has played for every representing Fiji team. From the u17's in 2011 to the national team in 2015. He has played at the 2015 FIFA U-20 World Cup and at the 2016 Summer Olympics with Fiji's under 23's. He made his debut for the national team on August 19, 2015 in a friendly game against Tonga. Fiji won the game by 5 goals to nil.

References

External links

 
 

Living people
1995 births
People from Bua Province
Association football central defenders
Fiji international footballers
Fijian footballers
Suva F.C. players
2016 OFC Nations Cup players
Footballers at the 2016 Summer Olympics
Olympic footballers of Fiji